Michael Estevao Pereira (26 December 1932 – 20 February 2019) was a Kenyan field hockey player. He competed in the men's tournament at the 1956 Summer Olympics.

References

External links
 

1932 births
2019 deaths
Kenyan male field hockey players
Olympic field hockey players of Kenya
Field hockey players at the 1956 Summer Olympics
Place of birth missing
Kenyan people of Indian descent
Kenyan people of Goan descent
Kenyan emigrants to the United Kingdom
Sportspeople from London
British sportspeople of Indian descent
British people of Goan descent